Sinkevičius is the masculine form of a Lithuanian family name. Its feminine forms  are: Sinkevičienė (married woman or widow) and Sinkevičiūtė (unmarried woman).

Rimantas Sinkevičius (born 1952), Lithuanian politician, Minister of Transport
Mindaugas Sinkevičius (born 1984), Lithuanian politician, former Minister of Economy and Mayor of Jonava
Virginijus Sinkevičius (born 1990), Lithuanian politician, European Commissioner for Environment, Oceans and Fisheries

Lithuanian-language surnames